This article shows the rosters of all participating teams at the 2021 FIVB Volleyball Men's Club World Championship in Betim, Brazil.

Cucine Lube Civitanova
The following is the roster of the Italian club Cucine Lube Civitanova in the 2021 FIVB Volleyball Men's Club World Championship.

Sirjan Foolad
The following is the roster of the Iranian club Sirjan Foolad in the 2021 FIVB Volleyball Men's Club World Championship.

Funvic Natal
The following is the roster of the Brazilian club Funvic Natal in the 2021 FIVB Volleyball Men's Club World Championship.

Sada Cruzeiro
The following is the roster of the Brazilian club Sada Cruzeiro in the 2021 FIVB Volleyball Men's Club World Championship.

Itas Trentino
The following is the roster of the Italian club Itas Trentino in the 2021 FIVB Volleyball Men's Club World Championship.

UPCN San Juan
The following is the roster of the Argentine club UPCN San Juan in the 2021 FIVB Volleyball Men's Club World Championship.

References

Club
FIVB